Keystroke may refer to:

 the action of typing on a computer or typewriter
 a switching for computer hardware engineers
 an event for software engineers and programmers